Bidloo is a surname of Flemish origin. A notable family by that name were the Amsterdam Mennonites of the later Dutch Golden Age.

 Govert Bidloo (1649-1713), Dutch professor of anatomy, poet, playwright, physician to William III of England
 Lambert Bidloo (1638-1724), older brother of Govert, Dutch apothecary, controversialist, poet, translator
 Nicolaas Bidloo (1674-1731), son of Lambert, physician to Peter the Great, father of Russian medicine